Waayhoek is a town in Uthukela District Municipality in the KwaZulu-Natal province of South Africa.

References

Populated places in the Alfred Duma Local Municipality